Tobias Reinkemeier (born 7 April 1987) is a German professional poker player from Cuxhaven.

Poker
Reinkemeier began playing poker in 2006 and started playing live tournaments in 2007 with small cashes.

At the 2009 EPT Barcelona Main Event, Reinkemeier was accused of angle shooting professional poker player Roland De Wolfe after calling De Wolfe's river bet. As the last player to have either bet or raised during the final round of betting, De Wolfe was expected to reveal his hand first. After a brief discussion, De Wolfe intentionally flashed  face up, then placed the same card face down without revealing his second hole card, presumably to suggest his hesitancy to showing a bluff. With cards in hand, De Wolfe appears to fold by motioning both hole cards towards the muck, and temporarily placing both hole cards under the pile of discarded cards. As De Wolfe appeared to have surrendered the pot, Reinkemeier immediately revealed  which failed to make a club flush and finished with High Card Queen. Recognizing this, De Wolfe attempted to retrieve his cards claiming his hand was not mucked. A tournament director was called to the table to settle the growing dispute, and ruled that De Wolfe had indeed folded awarding the pot to Reinkemeier.

In 2010, Reinkemeier won the EPT €25,000 High Roller event for €965,000. Reinkemeier finished 5th in the 2014 WSOP $1,000,000 Big One for One Drop event, earning $2,053,334.

Reinkemeier plays online under the nickname PokerNoob999. He won 29 May 2011 Sunday Millions on PokerStars for $135,053. As of 2016, Reinkemeier's live tournament winnings exceed $10,500,000 putting him 3rd on the German all time money list behind Fedor Holz and Ole Schemion.

As of 2019 he had left playing Poker with a net worth of only around 130.000 Euro after the good run ended.

Personal life
Reinkemeier was born in Germany and currently resides in London.

References

External links 
Tobias Reinkemeier Hendon Mob profile

1987 births
German poker players
Living people